Marta Salogni is an Italian record producer, mixer and recording engineer.

Salogni's musical background was cultivated in her native Italy between the small towns of Capriolo and Brescia, where she spent her formative years, collaborating with musical acts of all styles.

She started working as a live sound engineer for the local social centre and independent radio station Radio Onda D'Urto, non-profit left-wing venues and counterculture organizations for a variety of gigs, festivals, and theatre productions. After moving to London in 2010 she took a 9 months course at Alchemea College of Audio Engineering to learn Pro Tools, and shortly after began her career working as a recording engineer across major recording studios both nationally and internationally.

As a producer and mixer, Marta Salogni has worked with Björk, Romy, M.I.A., Groove Armada, Animal Collective, Black Midi, HAAi, Dream Wife, Holly Herndon, Porridge Radio, Anna Meredith, Ela Minus, Methyl Ethyl, Lafawndah, Puma Blue, Kàryyn, Planningtorock, Daniel Avery,  Duval Timothy, Emel Mathlouthi, Factory Floor, Kelela, Liars, Alex Cameron, Daniel Blumberg, Little Boots, Temples, Insecure Men, The Orielles, HMLTD, and Django Django. 

As an engineer, Salogni worked with producers such as Danton Supple and David Wrench. Alongside Wrench, she has worked on projects with Frank Ocean, The xx, Goldfrapp, FKA Twigs, Blossoms, Glass Animals, Pixx, Shura, Bloc Party, and LA Priest. She has also worked on Tracey Thorn's 2018 Record alongside producer Ewan Pearson.

Salogni has worked with the record labels XL Recordings, Young Turks, Mute, DFA Records, Virgin EMI Records, 4AD, Polydor Records, Domino Recording Company, Heavenly Recordings, Sony Music, and One Little Indian.

She is involved in the London music scene, playing both composed and improvised live sets using tape machines, loops, and feedbacks.

She recorded and mixed the next Depeche Mode album Memento Mori with James Ford, who produced the band's previous album Spirit.

Marta has been awarded the MPG (Music Producer’s Guild) Breakthrough Engineer of the Year 2018,  Breakthrough Producer of the Year 2020 and UK Music Producer of the Year 2022

References

External links 
 Music Producers Guild Reveals the Winners of its 2018 Awards 
 Intervista: Marta Salogni (produttrice/mixer/ingegnere del suono per Björk, Frank Ocean, M.I.A, The xx) + 30 canzoni x Rumore
 Marta Salogni Discography 
 AllMusic
 Discogs | Marta Salogni
 Da Capriolo all’Islanda: «Ho mixato il disco di Björk»
 Da Brescia a Londra per vivere di musica, fra scienza e creatività
 AES student event returns this weekend
 Engineer Marta Salogni on mixing for Bjork and freelancing in a fickle industry
 Marta Salogni Wins MPG Breakthrough Engineer Award

Living people
Italian record producers
Italian audio engineers
Italian women record producers
Year of birth missing (living people)